Some Gave All is the debut studio album by American singer Billy Ray Cyrus. It was his first album for Mercury Records in 1992 and became the best selling album of that year in the United States, selling over 9 million copies in the first 12 months of release. It produced four hit singles on the Billboard country charts. The first of these was Cyrus's breakthrough song "Achy Breaky Heart", which topped the charts in several countries. In the US it was a five-week number one on the Hot Country Songs chart, as well as a top 5 hit on the Billboard Hot 100. It became the first single ever to achieve triple Platinum status in Australia and was the best-selling single of 1992 in the same country. Thanks to the video of the song, there was an explosion of line dancing into the mainstream, becoming a craze. The song earned Grammy Award nominations for Cyrus in the categories Record of the Year and Best Country Vocal Performance, Male. That same year, Cyrus also received a Grammy Award nomination for Best New Artist. "Achy Breaky Heart" was originally recorded as "Don't Tell My Heart" by The Marcy Brothers on their 1991 self-titled album.

"Could've Been Me", "Wher'm I Gonna Live?" and "She's Not Cryin' Anymore" were also released as singles, peaking at numbers 2, 23, and 6, respectively, on the country charts. The title track also reached number 52 based on unsolicited airplay and Cyrus' cover of "These Boots Are Made for Walkin'" charted only outside the United States.

Critical reception 

Reviewing for The Village Voice in December 1992, Robert Christgau was critical of Cyrus for "oversinging like Michael Bolton at a Perot rally" throughout the album and for celebrating warfare in the title song. However, he offered some approval of Cyrus's "nice macho self-mockery" on "Achy Breaky Heart", "Wher'm I Gonna Live?", and "I'm So Miserable", concluding that with time he may develop into a 21st-century version of Waylon Jennings.

In 2006, Some Gave All ranked at number 33 in Q magazine's list of "The 50 Worst Albums Ever!"

Commercial performance
Overall, the album is his most successful album to date, which has been certified 9× Multi-Platinum in the United States and is the longest time spent by a debut artist at number one on the Billboard 200 (17 consecutive weeks) and most consecutive chart-topping weeks in the SoundScan era. It is the only album (from any genre) in the SoundScan era to log 17 consecutive weeks at number one and is also the top-ranking debut album by a country artist. It ranked 43 weeks in the top 10, a total topped by only one country album in history, Ropin' the Wind by Garth Brooks. Some Gave All was also the first debut album to enter at the number 1 in the Billboard Country Albums chart. The album has also sold more than 20 million copies worldwide and is the best-selling debut album of all time for a solo artist and remains one of the biggest selling albums of all time. Some Gave All was also the best-selling album of 1992 in the US with 4.7 million copies sold. As of April 2019 the album has sold 7.5 million copies in United States according to Nielsen Music.

Track listing

Personnel
Adapted credits from the media notes of Some Gave All.

Sly Dog
 Billy Ray Cyrus – lead vocals, backing vocals
 Greg Fletcher – drums, percussion
 Corky Holbrook – bass guitar
 Terry Shelton – acoustic guitar, electric guitar
 Barton Stevens – keyboards, backing vocals

Additional musicians
 Clyde Carr – backing vocals
 Costo Davis – synthesizer
 Sonny Garrish – steel guitar
 Keith D. Hinton – acoustic guitar, electric guitar
 Joe Scaife – backing vocals

Production
Joe Scaife  – co-producer, mixing
Jim Cotton – co-producer, mixing
Grahame Snith – assistant engineer
Clyde Carr – assistant engineer
Hank Williams – mastering

Chart positions

Album

End-of-decade charts

Singles

Other charted songs

Certifications

See also
List of best-selling albums in the United States
List of number-one albums of 1992 (U.S.)

References

1992 debut albums
Billy Ray Cyrus albums
Mercury Nashville albums
Canadian Country Music Association Top Selling Album albums